Horninghold  is a small village and parish seven miles north-east of Market Harborough in the county of Leicestershire.

The village's name means 'wood belonging to the people of Horning'.

Following the Norman Conquest in 1066 the village was given to Robert de Todeni, Lord of Belvoir. In about 1076 he gave the parish to the priory of Belvoir where it remained until the Dissolution of the Monasteries in the 16th century. The population of the civil parish (including Allexton and Stockerston) was 316 at the 2011 census.   At the beginning of the 20th century, the estate owners, the Hardcastle family remodelled the village as a garden village with many trees and shrubs. The church of St Peter was built in the 12th century and is a surviving example of a parish church without Victorian restoration.

References

External links

  Village Web Site
 Ordnance Survey Map of Village from multimap
 Photographs of village from Geograph
 History of Horninghold
  Photographs inside Horninghold Church from Flickr
  Amset Centre Bridgford House -  Carbon Neutral home
 Amset Centre Renewable Energy consultancy in Hornighold

Villages in Leicestershire
Civil parishes in Harborough District